Daniel Lee Corwin (September 13, 1958 – December 7, 1998) was an American serial killer who was sentenced to death and executed for murdering three women.

Early life 
Corwin was born in Orange County, California.

Crimes 
In 1975, Corwin abducted a classmate at knife point in their high school parking lot while she was getting into her car. He drove her to a remote location in her own car and raped her. He then dragged her out of the car, knocked her down, slit her throat, and stabbed her in the stomach and heart. As she lay in a dirt pit bleeding, he covered her head with a board and covered it with dirt and leaves. She survived, and managed to reach the road where she was eventually seen and saved. Corwin was sentenced to forty years in prison for kidnapping, rape and attempted murder. Corwin was released early after nine years.

In February 1987, he abducted 72-year-old Alice Martin, who was walking to her home in Normangee, Texas. He drove her to a field in Robertson County where he raped, gagged and stabbed her.

In July 1987, he kidnapped 26-year-old Debra Lynn Ewing from her Huntsville workplace and drove her to Montgomery County, where he raped and stabbed her.

On October 31, 1987, he attempted to kidnap 36-year-old Mary Carrell Risinger at a car wash in Huntsville. She resisted and screamed for help, which resulted in Corwin slitting her throat in front of her 3-year-old daughter.

In October 1988, he abducted another woman Wendy Gant, in her own car, raping, beating and stabbing her several times. He slit her throat and left her for dead. Gant was feigning death and after he left she was able to untie her hands and make her way to a road, where she was found by a driver who summoned police and medical aid.

Corwin was tracked down using an artist's sketch from Gant, whose throat was cut so deeply that she could not speak to describe the assailant, but described him in writing to the artist and nodded yes or no to the artist's questions about the attacker's features. A corrections officer who knew Corwin from prison recognized the sketch when he saw it on the local television news and reported Corwin's name to police. Police subsequently found a fingerprint from Corwin on the driver's side door of Gant's vehicle.

During his trial, Corwin confessed to another rape, that of a 13-year-old girl that took place in 1972 when he was only 13 or 14. The police were notified at the time, but the victim couldn't identify her attacker.

Trial and Execution 
In 1990, Corwin was convicted of capital murder. The capital conviction was obtained under a recently implemented state law which permits capital convictions for murders committed "during different criminal transactions but committed pursuant to the same scheme or course of conduct. He was sentenced to death by a Montgomery Court.

Corwin was executed by lethal injection at the Huntsville Unit on December 7, 1998. In his final statement, Corwin apologized to the families of the victims, saying "I guess the first thing I want to do is thank some very special people, Sara and Sabrina, and for affording me the opportunity that y’all did. It made a real big difference in my life. I thank you. Thank you again from the deepest part of my heart. I’m sorry. The biggest thing I wanted to say was to you and family, and I know I haven’t had a chance to talk with y’all in any form or fashion or way or manner, and I regret what happened and I want you to know that I’m sorry. I just ask and hope that sometime down the line that you can forgive me. I think in a lot of ways that without that it becomes very empty and hollow and the only thing we have is hatred and anger. I guess the only thing I have to say about the death penalty is that a lot of times people think of it as one-sided, but it’s not. It’s two-sided. There's pain on both sides and it’s not an issue that people just sit there and voice off and say, well, this is a good thing, or this is a bad thing. But it’s something that’s, you know, needs to be looked at and desired in each heart. I just hope that all of you can understand that and someday forgive me. I want to thank y’all for affording me the opportunity to talk and meet with y'all. It meant so much. Thank you so much for being with me and my family. Thank you. I love you."

In media 
His case was shown on Forensic Files II. The episode, titled "Portrait of a Serial Killer," originally aired on HLN on March 15, 2020.

See also 
 Capital punishment in Texas
 Capital punishment in the United States
 List of people executed in Texas, 1990–1999
 List of serial killers in the United States

References 

1958 births
1998 deaths
20th-century executions by Texas
20th-century executions of American people
American rapists
Executed American serial killers
Male serial killers
People convicted of murder by Texas
People executed by Texas by lethal injection
Violence against women in the United States